Growgirl is a 2012 book by former actor Heather Donahue about dropping out of Hollywood and moving to a semi-collective society in Nevada County, California's Sierra Mountains called "Nuggettown" to become first a "pot wife" then embrace the "backbreaking, spirit-sucking work" of a  cannabis grower.

Critical reception 
The Hollywood Reporter called the work "always funny and surprisingly sweet". Publishers Weekly said it was "wry, with a nuanced distance from the events". Kirkus Reviews called it "at times funny, sensitive or filled with obscenities...an intimate look at a woman's yearlong search for her place in the world".

See also
 List of books about cannabis

References

Sources

Further reading

2012 non-fiction books
American books about cannabis
American memoirs
Memoirs about drugs
Gotham Books books